General Fairchild may refer to:

Lucius Fairchild (1831–1896), Union Army brigadier general
Muir S. Fairchild (1894–1950), U.S. Air Force general

See also
Attorney General Fairchild (disambiguation)